Sarah Arvio (born April 3, 1954) is an American poet, essayist and translator.

She is the author of Visits from the Seventh, Sono: cantos, and night thoughts: 70 dream poems & notes from an analysis and a combined edition of Sono and Visits from the Seventh.

She has won the Rome Prize in Literature from the American Academy of Arts and Letters, a Guggenheim fellowship, a Bogliasco fellowship, and a National Endowment for the Arts Translation Fellowship, and other honors.

Life
Arvio has lived in Caracas, Mexico City, Paris, Rome and New York.
She works as a translator for the United Nations in New York and Switzerland; she has also taught poetry at Princeton.

Career
Arvio has been widely published in journals and magazines. Her work has also appeared in many anthologies, including The Best American Poetry 2015, The Best American Poetry 1998, The Best American Erotic Poetry, Women's Work, the FSG Book of 20th Century Italian Poetry, the Oxford Book of Latin American Short Stories, and Ariadne's Thread:  A Collection of Contemporary Women's Journals.

The poet and philosopher John Koethe, in his citation for Arvio's Boston Review prize, said this:  

Her poems have been set to music:  William Bolcom set “Chagrin” for mezzo-soprano and chamber ensemble in a song cycle entitled "The Hawthorn Tree”  (which also adapts poems by Louise Bogan, Willa Cather, Anne Carson, Stevie Smith and Elinor Wylie).  Steven Burke set “Armor” in a monodrama entitled “Skin,” for mezzo-soprano and cello. Miriama Young composed “Côte d’Azur” as "Inner Voices of Blue," first for tenor and chamber ensemble, later resetting it for mezzo-soprano.

She was the translator and poetry editor for the film, Azul: Land of Poets (1988), directed by Roland Legiardi-Laura. She also worked as a research associate for the landmark film series on American poets, Voices & Visions, which aired on PBS in 1988.

Awards and honors 

 1992: National Endowment for the Arts Translation Fellowship
 1997: Paris Review's B.F. Connors (long poem) Prize
 1999: Poetry's Frederick Bock Prize
 2003-2004: Rome Prize
 2005-2006: Guggenheim Fellowship
 2008: Boston Review Annual Poetry Contest
 2012: Bogliasco Fellowship

Books 

 Visits from the Seventh, New York : Alfred A. Knopf, 2002. , 
 Sono: Cantos, New York, N.Y: Knopf, 2006. , 
 Sono : with Visits from the seventh, Northumberland: Bloodaxe Books, 2009. , 
 Night thoughts: 70 dream poems & notes from an analysis, New York: Knopf, 2014. 2013 , 
Translation
 Federico  García Lorca, Poet in Spain New York : Alfred A. Knopf, 2017.  ,

References

External links 
 Sarah Arvio's Web Site
 Arvio's Author Page at Knopf
 Lisa Williams reviews night thoughts on In My Own Accent, Accents Radio February 2, 2013: http://katerinaklemer.com/ownaccent/accents-on-books-with-lisa-williams/
 Grace Cavalieri reviews night thoughts on Washington Independent Review of Books, February 12, 2013 http://www.washingtonindependentreviewofbooks.com/features/february-exemplars-poetry-reviews
 Jenny Xie, “The Poetic Unconscious: An Interview with Sarah Arvio,” in the Los Angeles Review of Books, October 19, 2013. http://lareviewofbooks.org/interview/the-poetic-unconscious-an-interview-with-sarah-arvio
 Brian Brodeur, “How A Poem Happens,” November 15, 2011 http://howapoemhappens.blogspot.com/2011/11/sarah-arvio.html
 Sono reviewed in “Books Briefly Noted,” The New Yorker, May 8, 2006 http://www.newyorker.com/archive/2006/05/08/060508crbn_brieflynoted2
 Sono reviewed in “Poet’s Choice,” Robert Pinsky, in The Washington Post, March 5, 2006 https://www.washingtonpost.com/wp-dyn/content/article/2006/03/02/AR2006030201513.html
 Visits from the Seventh reviewed in “Books Briefly Noted,” The New Yorker, February 18, 2002 http://www.newyorker.com/archive/2002/02/18/020218crbn_brieflynoted4
 On "Wild Nights" by Emily Dickinson in Poetry Society of America, February, 2014 http://www.poetrysociety.org/psa/poetry/crossroads/old_school/sarah_arvio

American women poets
1954 births
Living people
21st-century American women